The Egyptian Ministry of Communications and Information Technology (MCIT) is a government body headquartered in Smart Village Egypt, Giza Governorate, in the Cairo metropolitan area. Established in 1999, the Ministry is responsible for information and communications technology (ICT) issues in the Arab Republic of Egypt including the planning, implementation and operation of government ICT plans and strategies. It is led by the Minister of Communications and Information Technology, who is nominated by the Prime Minister and is a member of the cabinet. The current ICT Minister is Amr Talaat who assumed the position on 14 June 2018.

Background
In September 1999, former President Hosni Mubarak announced the inauguration of a national program to develop the information and communication technology sector in Egypt. The goals of the program were to foster the development of an information society in Egypt and stimulate the growth of a strong, competitive, vibrant and export-oriented ICT sector. The cornerstone of this program was the establishment of the ministry, in October 1999, to lead these efforts.

MCIT, then headed by Ahmed Nazif, soon launched a national plan for communications and information technology, establishing projects and initiatives, including the Egyptian Information Society Initiative (EISI), geared to support and empower public-private partnerships to develop and expand telecommunications infrastructure; provide ICT access to all citizens; develop meaningful Arabic content; establish a large pool of trained ICT professionals to create and innovate; build a policy framework and support infrastructure to foster the growth of a powerful and competitive ICT industry; and leverage ICT to empower development in health, education, government, commerce, culture and other areas.

Vision and mission
Egypt's Ministry of Communications and Information Technology was established to facilitate the country's assimilation into the global information society. Its mandate is to support the development of the local ICT industry, thereby boosting exports and creating jobs, promoting the use of ICT nationwide as a means to achieve national development goals, and building the foundations of a knowledge society in Egypt—in close collaboration with other governmental, civil society and private sector entities. Since its establishment, MCIT—in partnership with other governmental bodies, non-governmental organizations and the private sector—has worked to develop the foundational infrastructure and framework for an information society in Egypt. Following the conclusion of the Egyptian Information Society Initiative in 2006, MCIT initiated the 2007 - 2010 strategy with the objective of further restructuring the sector, developing a knowledge society and supporting the ICT industry with a focus on expanding exports of ICT products and services. According to the 2010 ICT Strategy, the ministry's main priorities are to:
 Continue development of a state-of-the-art ICT infrastructure that provides an enabling environment for government and businesses throughout Egypt and links it globally
 Create a vibrant and export-oriented ICT industry
 Leverage public-private partnerships as an implementation mechanism whenever possible
 Enable society to absorb and benefit from expanding sources of information
 Create a learning community whose members have access to all the resources and information they require regardless of gender and location, thereby allowing all to achieve their full potential and play a part in the country's socioeconomic development
 Support skills development required by the ICT industry
 Support research and innovation in ICT
MCIT new 2014- 2018 strategy primarily considers the political and economic changes taking place in Egypt, the development of the communications sector both regionally and internationally and Egypt's national development priorities.

Ministers
A relatively new entity, MCIT was established in October 1999. Ahmed Nazif served as the first minister from 1999 to 2004. His successor, Tarek Kamel, served as minister from July 2004 to February 2011. Magued Osman was appointed as the ICT minister in the caretaker government from February to July 2011. Mohamed Salem then held the position until 2 August 2012, and was replaced by Hany Mahmoud who was appointed on that date. In January 2013, Atef Helmy assumed the position, and in March 2015, Khaled Negm was appointed as the ICT minister. Yasser ElKady was appointed on 19 September 2015. The current ICT minister is Amr Talaat who assumed position on 14 June 2018.

Initiatives
MCIT initiatives and objectives include the following:
 ICT sector restructuring, including legislative reform, to create a market more appealing to local and foreign investment
 Free Internet: a service launched in January 2002 by Telecom Egypt, in partnership with the majority of the country's Internet service providers, eliminating monthly subscription fees for dial-up Internet access, with users required only to pay the price of the local phone call to connect to the network
 Broadband Initiative: launched in May 2004 to increase the availability of high-speed broadband connections at reduced flat rates and to promote public awareness of the advantages of broadband Internet access over dial-up access
 Fixed and Mobile Licensing Program: this resulted in a national roaming agreement signed by the three mobile operators (Orange Egypt, Vodafone Egypt and Etisalat Egypt) and the National Telecommunications Regulatory Authority (NTRA) in June 2007 to provide users with expanded 3G services
 Launch of the country's code top-level domain “.misr”
 Postal sector reform program: launched in 2002 to modernize Egypt Post by improving services, expanding capabilities and developing new revenue streams
 Enhancing the framework governing the use of ICT networks and services
 ICT for Development: a group of projects designed to leverage the potential of ICT to help Egypt achieve its human development goals and improve the lives of citizens using public-private partnerships to facilitate the planning, implementation, analysis and dissemination of projects throughout all sectors of the economy, including health, education, culture and government services
 Promoting innovation and ICT industry development, including research and development, training, investment and e-business
 Establishing technology parks, including Smart Village and Maadi Contact Centers Park
 Developing mutually beneficial partnerships with governments and agencies, civil society organizations and multilateral organizations around the world to share expertise and explore and develop opportunities
 Developing a digital economy with the World Bank

Affiliate Organizations
National Telecommunications Regulatory AuthorityThe National Telecommunications Regulatory Authority of Egypt (NTRA) was founded in 2003 according to the Telecommunications Regulation Law as a national authority to administer the telecommunication sector. The scope of NTRA work covers issues related to transparency, open competition, universal service and protection of user rights. NTRA acts as an independent arbiter for ICT sector stakeholders.

The Information Technology Industry Development Agency (ITIDA)The Information Technology Industry Development Agency (ITIDA) was founded in 2004 as an executive IT arm of the Ministry Of Communications and Information Technology. Located in Smart Village, ITIDA is a government entity mandated to boost the development of the Egyptian IT sector and increase its global competitiveness. Affiliated to the Ministry of Communications and Information Technology, ITIDA is tasked with developing the IT industry through identifying the needs of local industry and addressing them with tailored programs. The agency's responsibilities also include enhancing the Egyptian cybersecurity and data protection framework to facilitate e-business and business process outsourcing (BPO) activities. Through its Intellectual Property Rights (IPR) Office, ITIDA aims at ensuring effective enforcement of the Copyright Law, fighting piracy and sanctioning infringements in order to guarantee effective protection for computer programs and databases. The IPR Office works to raise awareness and understanding of intellectual property rights in the software community and for the public at large, and cooperates with different bodies concerned with IPR on both the national and international levels. The office also functions as a depository for computer programs and databases, provides licenses for reproducing and translating computer programs and databases for educational purposes, and issues mandatory permission to practice for software enterprises.

Egypt PostFounded in 1865, the Egyptian National Post Organization (ENPO) is the largest provider of postal services in Egypt, providing services including the delivery of correspondence, documents, money and goods.

Information Technology Institute

The Information Technology Institute (ITI) was founded in 1992 by the Government of Egypt's Information and Decision Support Center (IDSC) to assist in paving the way for the evolution of a knowledge-based society by developing a new generation of professionals. Prime Minister Dr. Ahmed Nazif shifted the affiliation of ITI to the Ministry of Communications and Information Technology in April 2005. Every year, ITI accepts a limited number of graduates of any discipline for its training program, which offers 14 various specializations.

National Telecommunication InstituteThe National Telecommunication Institute (NTI), affiliated to the Ministry of Communications and Information Technology, was founded in 1984 as a scientific institute with university status. The institute specializes in training, education and research activities in the field of telecommunications.

The Center for Documentation of Cultural and Natural Heritage
The Center for Documentation of Cultural and Natural Heritage (CULTNAT) was established in January 2000 as a project operating under the auspices of the Ministry of Communications and Information Technology. In 2003, CULTNAT turned into an affiliate of MCIT and Bibliotheca Alexandrina. The center runs an array of projects and programs for the documentation of both the tangible and intangible aspects of Egypt's cultural and natural heritage, including archaeology, architecture, manuscripts, music, folklore, caricatures, plastic arts and natural resources.

The Technology Innovation and Entrepreneurship CenterThe Technology Innovation and Entrepreneurship Center (TIEC) aims to drive innovation and entrepreneurship in the ICT field for the benefit of national economy. The center was launched at Smart Village in September 2010.

Related Institutions
Smart Village EgyptEgypt's Smart Village is a business park covering three million square meters and offers high-tech facilities and infrastructure for IT and telecom companies.

 Technology Development Fund

The Technology Development Fund is a venture capital fund established by the Ministry of Communications and Information Technology in 2004 as a public-private partnership to finance and support Egyptian startups in the ICT sector.

See also

 Cabinet of Egypt

References

External links

 Ministry of Communications and Information Technology official site
 National Telecommunications Regulatory Authority (NTRA)
 Information Technology Industry Development Agency (ITIDA)
 Information Technology Institute (ITI)
 Smart Village Cairo, business and technology park
 Egypt's Cabinet Database

1999 establishments in Egypt
Communications in Egypt
Egypt
Information ministries
Communications and Information Technology (Egypt)
Communications and Information Technology